Sara Banerji (née Mostyn) (born 6 June 1932) is a British author, artist and sculptor. She was born in England, but lived in Southern Rhodesia and then in India for many years. She now lives in Oxford with her family.

Biography
Banerji was born in 1932, one of the children of Anita Mostyn, a novelist who wrote in the 1950s under the pen name Anne Mary Fielding, and Sir Basil Mostyn, the 13th Baronet of Mostyn, in Stoke Poges, Buckinghamshire, in England. One of her ancestors is Henry Fielding.

In 1939, when Banerji was seven, World War II began, and she was evacuated to various large and old country mansions. Her father, Basil Mostyn, fought in the war.

After the war was over, Banerji emigrated with her family to Southern Rhodesia, where her father grew tobacco. The family lived in a single mud rondavel with no electricity or running water.

Banerji later travelled around Europe. She worked as an au pair and also attended art school in Austria. She has also worked as an artist, and has held exhibitions of her oil paintings in India. She also taught riding whilst in India, and has been a jockey. She is also a sculptor, and has previously been a waitress.

Banerji worked in a coffee house in Oxford, where she met her future husband, Ranjit Banerji, who was an undergraduate from India. He was a customer in the coffee house. They married and moved to India, where they lived for 17 years. Banerji attempted to run a dairy farm, but was defeated by seasons of heavy rain.

The Banerji family returned to England in 1973. Ranjit and Sara had £5 each, giving the family a total of £10. Banerji borrowed money, bought some ponies at auction and gave riding lessons. A while later, she started a gardening business in Sussex.

Banerji and her husband now live in Oxford, where she teaches writing in the Oxford University Department for Continuing Education. They practise meditation and yogic flying every day. They have three daughters and five grandchildren. Banerji holds frequent exhibitions of her work.

Bibliography
Cobwebwalking (1986)
The Wedding of Jayanthi Mandel (1987)
The Tea Planter's Daughter (1988)
Shining Agnes (1991)
Absolute Hush (1991)
Writing on Skin (1993)
Shining Hero (2002)
The Waiting Time (2006)
Blood Precious (2007)

References
WorldCat author page
"Sara Banerji." Contemporary Authors Online. Detroit: Gale, 2001. Biography in Context. Web. 17 Jan. 2014. Gale Document Number: GALE|H1000004907
 Profile at FantasticFiction
 Profile at Transita
The Collapse of Fairyland. ROBB FORMAN DEW. The New York Times. 18 October 1987. 18 January 2014
 anna battista Book Review: Sara Banerji's The Waiting Time 18 January 2014
Indian exotica. Madhu Jain. India Today. 18 January 2014
The Hindu. Review of Shining Hero. 18 January 2014

1932 births
Living people
20th-century Indian women artists
21st-century Indian women artists
20th-century English women artists
21st-century English women artists
British expatriates in Zimbabwe
British expatriates in India
British writers
English women sculptors
Indian women sculptors
Women writers from West Bengal